Shahrak-e Babak Romanized as Shahrak-e Bābāk; also known as Shahrak-e Āzādī) is a city in Howmeh Rural District, in the Central District of Andimeshk County, Khuzestan Province, Iran. At the 2006 census, its population was 4,576, in 925 families.

References 

Populated places in Andimeshk County
Cities in Khuzestan Province